Auguste Thijs was a Belgian wrestler. He competed at the 1920 and 1924 Summer Olympics.

References

External links
 

Year of birth missing
Year of death missing
Olympic wrestlers of Belgium
Wrestlers at the 1920 Summer Olympics
Wrestlers at the 1924 Summer Olympics
Belgian male sport wrestlers
Place of birth missing
20th-century Belgian people